Amany Rashad Abdelaal Mohamed (born 1 July 1983) is a football player for the Egyptian national women's team. As of 2011, she plays for Wadi Degla FC.

References

1983 births
Living people
Place of birth missing (living people)
Egyptian women's footballers
Women's association football midfielders
Egypt women's international footballers